Swimming Canada is the Canadian national governing body for competitive swimming in the country.

Swimming Canada oversees the management of all swim programs throughout the nation and provides the foundation for beginner-level athletes to train towards the elite level, with the chance to attend world championships and the Olympic Games.  The national headquarters is located in Ottawa, Ontario, with staff dispersed throughout Canada.

History 
The Canadian Amateur Swimming Association was established in 1909, after the preliminary appearance of a Canadian swimmer at the London 1908 Summer Olympics. Robert Zimmerman of Montreal was the first Canadian Swimmer to appear at any Olympic Games, competing in the 100m freestyle, 100m backstroke, and springboard Diving.

At the 1912 Summer Olympics, George Hodgson won Canada's first two Olympic swimming medals and set a world record in the 1500 meter freestyle. Elaine Tanner became the first Canadian to win three swimming medals at the Mexico 1968 Summer Olympics. In the Montreal 1976 Summer Olympics, Canadian swimmers accounted for eight of the total 11 medals won by Team Canada.

The Canadian Olympic team has brought swimmers to each Olympic Games, except for the 1980 Summer Olympics in Moscow, due to a government boycott. Over the past 100 years, Canadian swimmers have earned over 40 medals at the Olympic games, as well as many other successes through World Championship competitions.

In the Rio 2016 Summer Olympics, the Canadian women's swim team earned six out of the 22 medals that Team Canada won during the Games. Four of the six medals were earned by 16 year-old Penny Oleksiak, the only Canadian to win four medals in a single Olympic Games.

Meets 
Swimming Canada works with local club teams, university teams and national select teams, as well as community members to make annual events possible.
 Canadian Swimming Championships: Senior national championship swim meet. Swimmers may range from Olympic athletes to rising Olympic potential who have all qualified for the national time standards (50M) established for that year.
 Age Group Championships: A competition divided by gender, for swimmers 18 years and younger. Created for athletes striving to reach the elite-level. This is typically a season-ending, long course (50M) competition that occurs annually at the end of July/beginning of August. Similar to the national competition, swimmers need to qualify for time standards established for their age and that apply to that year of competition.
 Trials: The annual competition which results in the selection of the Senior National and Junior National Canadian teams. During the Olympic year this competition will determine the selection for the Canadian Olympic team. This also requires time standards to be met in order to compete and is typically swam long course as well. During an Olympic year the top two people who qualify for FINA A time standards will make the Olympic Team and those events which qualify for a relay (100, 200 Free) will take the top four swimmers to the Games.
 Canadian Olympic & Para-Swimming Trails: This competition takes place every four years to determine the selection for the Canadian Olympic and Paralympic swim team.
 Speedo Eastern Open: In addition to national championship competitions, Swimming Canada pairs with local organizing committees to run a regional open meet. This meet is for Eastern Canadian clubs and swimmers where specific time standards are established for that area. These meets offer a competitive environment to prepare for trials, exposure to more elite competitions and provides an opportunity to prepare for larger competitions later in the year.
 Speedo  Western Open: Swimming Canada pairs with local organizing committees to run two regional open meets. This meet is for Western Canadian clubs and swimmers who have their own individual standards as well. These meets offer a competitive environment to prepare for trials, be exposed to more elite competitions and prepare for larger competitions later in the year.

Team Canada 
The national team as well as the junior national team is selected every year at Swimming Canada's Trials competition, and every four years those members form the Olympic team. Swimmers who win the meet and are able to achieve qualifying times set by FINA are then selected for the national team.

Circle of Excellence
Since 2001 Swimming Canada has honoured "the greatest Canadian swimmers of all time", and some coaches and builders, by induction into its Circle of Excellence.

Swimmers

Ryan Cochrane 	2017
Stephanie Dixon 	2016
Marcel Gery 	2015
Stephen Clarke 	2015
Andrew Haley 	2015
Donna-Marie Gurr 	2013
Joanne (Mucz) Vergara 	2012
Graham Smith 	2012
Wendy Quirk 	2012
Becky Smith 	2012
Tim McIsaac 	2012
Josée Lake 	2012
Ralph Hutton 	2011
Mike West 	2011
Jessica Sloan 	2011
Marion Lay 	2010
Marilyn Corson 	2010
Bruce Robertson 	2010
Michael Edgson 	2009
Cheryl Gibson 	2009
Elaine Tanner 	2009
Greg Streppel 	2009
Alex Baumann 	2008
Kelly Stefanyshyn 	2008
Leslie Cliff 	2007
Jane Kerr 	2006
Sandy Goss 	2006
Anne Jardin 	2006
Anne Gagnon 	2005
Nathalie Giguère 	2005
George Hodgson 	2005
Richard Pound 	2005
Mark Tewksbury 	2004
Anne Ottenbrite 	2004
Lori Melien 	2003
Keltie Duggan 	2003
Andrea Nugent 	2003
Tom Ponting 	2003
Cam Henning 	2003
Curtis Myden 	2002
Victor Davis 	2001

Coaches
Randy Bennett 	2018
Howard Firby 	2011
George Gate 	2008
Dr. Jeno Tihanyi 	2007
Deryk Snelling 	2007
Clifford Barry 	2007
Paul Meronen 	2007

Builders

Edgar Théôret 	2008
G.L "Flip" Filippelli 	2008

References

External links

Swimming in Canada
Swimming organizations